The Nokia Communicator is a brand name for a series of business-optimized smartphones marketed by Nokia Corporation, all of which appear as normal (if large) phones on the outside, and open in clamshell format to access a QWERTY keyboard and an LCD screen nearly the size of the device footprint.

Nokia Communicators have Internet connectivity and clients for Internet and non-Internet communication services. The earlier 9000 series Communicators introduced features which later developed into smartphones. The latest Communicator model, the Nokia E90 Communicator, is part of the Nokia Eseries.

Models

The Nokia 9300 and 9300i (running Symbian OS version 7.0s and Series 80 v2.0) are very similar to the Nokia 9500 but were not marketed under the Communicator name by Nokia. Likewise, the Nokia N97 and Nokia E7 (running Symbian^3) from 2009 and 2011 respectively are also similar to the Communicator series, but not marketed as it.

Movies
 The first Nokia smartphone in the movies was Nokia Communicator 9000: Val Kilmer as The Saint used the device to foil the plans of a villainous Russian oligarch back in 1997.
 In Terminator 3: Rise of the Machines the Terminatrix (T-X), played by Kristanna Loken, hijacks a silver Lexus SC 430 and uses a Nokia 9210 inside the car to dial-up a remote link to a local phone systems server.
 In Bad Company (2002) the special phone used by Chris Rock is the Nokia 9210.

Gallery

See also
 "Communicator" (Star Trek)
 List of Nokia products
 Nokia PC Suite
 OpenSync
 Series 80 (software platform)
 Asus M930w and Toshiba G910 / G920, adopted Nokia's design
 Cosmo Communicator, adopted Nokia's design and name

References

Nokia smartphones